Boisripeau is a settlement in Guadeloupe in the commune of Les Abymes, on the island of Grande-Terre.  Chazeau, Jabrun-du-Sud, and Malignon are to its east.

Populated places in Guadeloupe